Albert Baur (7 July 1835, Aachen - 7 May 1906, Düsseldorf) was a German painter, illustrator and engraver, associated with the Düsseldorfer Malerschule. He is sometimes referred to as Albert Baur the Elder, to distinguish him from his son, who was also an artist.

Biography 
He was born to a family of bankers and was originally sent to Bonn to study medicine. In 1854, against his parents' wishes, he quit medical school and enrolled at the Kunstakademie Düsseldorf, where he studied from 1855 to 1857. His primary instructors there were Christian Köhler and Heinrich Mücke. In 1860, he moved to Munich and spent two years as a student of Moritz von Schwind. In 1863, he married Marie Beuth (1841-1917) and they had four children.

This work was commissioned by the jurist, the father of Baur's friend and school colleague, Heinrich Ludwig Philippi, whose influence prompted him to specialize in history painting. One of his first major works depicted the body of Otto III being carried across the Alps to Germany.

In 1872, he was named a Professor at the Grand-Ducal Saxon Art School, Weimar, but his attendance was apparently rather sporadic as he took numerous study trips throughout Europe.  He returned to Düsseldorf in 1876 and lived there for the rest of his life.

Later, he added a mural showing Düsseldorf being taken over by Brandenburg in 1609, following a royal succession dispute.

References

Further reading 
 Friedrich Schaarschmidt: Zur Geschichte der Düsseldorfer Kunst, insbesondere im XIX. Jahrhundert. Kunstverein für die Rheinlande und Westfalen, Düsseldorf 1902, Pgs.242, 272, 277, 388, 319, 333, 334 (Online).
 Ludger Meier: "Die Odyssee eines Historienbildes." In: Nachrichtenblatt des Vereins Alter Dionysianer. 66, 2004, pgs.8–20 (Historiengemälde Baurs im ).

External links 

1835 births
1906 deaths
19th-century German painters
19th-century German male artists
German history painters
People from Aachen
Kunstakademie Düsseldorf alumni
20th-century German painters
20th-century German male artists